The sixth series of British reality television series The Apprentice (UK) was broadcast in the UK on BBC One, from 6 October to 19 December 2010; due to the 2010 General Election, which Alan Sugar had political ties with following his appointment as a Lord within the House of Lords, the BBC postponed the series' broadcast until Autumn of that year to avoid a potential conflict of interest from the broadcaster.

The sixth series is last to offer a six-figure job as a prize, before this particular area of the programme's format was changed for subsequent series at the request of Sugar. It is also the first series to feature Karren Brady as Margaret Mountford's successor to the role of Sugar's aide in the programme, after her initial appearance in this role for the first series of Young Apprentice. Despite announcing the previous year she was leaving the programme, Mountford retained a role within The Apprentice by taking over Brady's role as an interviewer in the Interviews stage. Alongside the standard twelve episodes, two specials were aired alongside this series – "The Final Five" on 9 December; and "Why I Fired Them" on 16 December.

Sixteen candidates took part in the sixth series, with Stella English becoming the overall winner, though she later caused controversy for the programme following her win that led to significant changes to the format of The Apprentice in later series. Excluding the specials, the series averaged around 7.87 million viewers during its broadcast.

Series overview 
Upon receiving applications from potential participants, production staff held regional auditions and interviews throughout July 2009, followed by a second round of interviews and assessments in London to determine the final selection of sixteen candidates. Prior to work beginning on the series, Alan Sugar was required to appoint a successor to Margaret Mountford, following her decision to quit her role in the show earlier that year, leading to Karren Brady, one of his interviewers, agreeing to the offer of becoming his new aide on the show. Her appointment was given a trial run during the production and broadcast of the first series of Young Apprentice, before it was finalised. Meanwhile, Mountford agreed to remain on the show, despite her educational studies, taking over Brady's role as an interviewer in the Interviews stage.

Filming for the sixth series began in Autumn 2009, with the intention of the episodes being ready for broadcast in March 2010. However, the announcement that a General Election would be taking place in May of that year, meant that the broadcaster had to postpone the series until the start of October, due to Sugar's then-official ties with the Labour government at the time. In a statement made about the postponement of the sixth series, Sugar revealed that running it during the General Election would have been a risk to the broadcaster's "impartiality" in political matters, due in part to his recent appointment as a Lord in the House of Lords earlier that year; candidates taking part were advised that during filming Sugar was no longer to be referred to by them as "Sir Alan", but "Lord Sugar" because of his new appointment.

The change towards an Autumn schedule for the programme resulted in the production team seeking to compensate viewers for the delay. This led to them arranging for the formation of a two-hour special to end the series on, focused on a crossover episode between The Apprentice and its sister show, The Apprentice: You're Fired!, on BBC One. As part of its production, the episode's format was devised to begin with a short intro by the active host for You're Fired, introducing the special and what was to come, before leading on into the main feature – the series finale of the main show – and then immediately followed by the sister show's segment of discussions and interviews, with subsequent repeats being entirely composed of the main show's series finale only. Production staff later decided to create subsequent crossover finales of the two episodes in future series, after finding the crossover format to be appealing with viewers.

For the candidates who took part, the first task saw the men name their team Synergy, while the women named their team Apollo. Prior to the start of filming for the second episode, Raleigh Addington was forced to drop out of the show after a member of his family was badly injured while on active duty in the British armed forces. His departure meant that Sugar could not perform a multiple firing outside of the Interviews stage. Of those who remained, Stella English would become the eventual winner, whereupon she remained in Sugar's employment until issues began to surface in May 2011, whilst working for his company Viglen. Complaining to her employer that she required a new role, as the existing one made her work like a "glorified PA" for Sugar, she would retain such comments for a year until her contract was up, whereupon it would not be renewed. After unsuccessfully suing Sugar, she would later face financial difficulties, before eventually securing work with crowdfunding TV channel Crowd Box TV.

Candidates

Performance chart 

Key:
 The candidate won this series of The Apprentice.
 The candidate was the runner-up.
 The candidate won as project manager on his/her team, for this task.
 The candidate lost as project manager on his/her team, for this task.
 The candidate was on the winning team for this task / they passed the Interviews stage.
 The candidate was on the losing team for this task.
 The candidate was brought to the final boardroom for this task.
 The candidate was fired in this task.
 The candidate lost as project manager for this task and was fired.
 The candidate left the competition prior to this task.

Episodes

Controversy 
Behaviour of Stella English after filming

Following the sixth series conclusion, production staff became concerned with the behaviour of Stella English after she had won the contest. A few days after winning a job under Alan Sugar, English quit her post after deeming it to be "a sham" employment. Shortly after her resignation, she complained against her former employer's response to her decision and subsequently attempted to sue him for constructive dismissal. Both Sugar and the producers disapproved of the negative media attention that English brought about after her case was dismissed, and agreed during a meeting that the format of The Apprentice could not continue for the next series. As a result, the format underwent a complete revamp before production began on the seventh series.

Ratings 
Official episode viewing figures are from BARB.

References

External links 

 

2010 British television seasons
06